Annie Guo VanDan is an American journalist. She is co-founder and president of Asian Avenue, a magazine published since 2006 that covers the Asian-American and Pacific Islander community of Denver, Colorado. In 2021 she won a Maynard Institute Fellowship from the Robert C. Maynard Institute for Journalism Education, which aims to promote equity and diversity in journalism. In 2021 she became a Project Manager for Colorado Equity Compass, a non-profit dedicated to improving health equity through "data storytelling", which entails presenting information in accessible visual and narrative forms for policy-makers and the public.

Family and education 
VanDan's family immigrated from Taipei, Taiwan to Colorado in 1988. After graduating from high school, she attended the University of Missouri and studied journalism.  She later earned an MBA from the University of Colorado Denver.

Journalism and health equity 
In 2006, VanDan co-founded Asian Avenue magazine with her mother, Christina Yutai Guo, as a printed monthly journal for the metro Denver area that appeals to the Asian-American and Pacific Islander (AAPI) community of Colorado.  In its print form and associated website, Asian Avenue covers AAPI people, businesses and cultural activities (such as the Denver Cherry Blossom Festival), along with issues of concern within the AAPI community such as LGBT rights, health disparities, changing patterns of immigration, vaccine hesitancy, and, in 2021, anti-Asian racism and xenophobia and the COVID-19 Hate Crimes Act.  The magazine's website also has sections devoted to food trends, new books by or about AAPI people, and films.

Under the leadership of VanDan and her mother, Asian Avenue has since 2009 presented an annual award called the Asian American Hero of Colorado, which recognizes AAPI leaders for work in the community. In October 2016 Asian Avenue received the Denver Mayor's Diversity & Inclusion Awards for the "innovation" category.  They have sponsored an annual lunar new year banquet in Denver which in January 2020 welcomed more than three hundred guests. They have also sponsored a program to promote leadership roles among AAPI women and female students. In June 2020 the magazine published articles about the Black Lives Matter movement and expressed "unequivocal support" for it while also discussing related issues in anti-Asian violence and racism in Colorado. In January 2021, Asian Avenue received a Martin Luther King, Jr. Business Award in recognition of these efforts.

In addition to her journalism, VanDan has worked for the Colorado Department of Public Health and Environment in the Office of Health Equity and Maternal and Child Health. She also managed communications for a nonprofit medical and mental health clinic in Denver that offers services to refugees and immigrants. In 2021 she became a Project Manager for Colorado Equity Compass, an initiative funded by The Colorado Trust, dedicated to improving health equity through "data storytelling": presenting information in accessible visual and narrative forms for policy-makers and members of the public. Among the areas she covers for Colorado Equity Compass is southeast Colorado Springs, which has one of the most racially and culturally diverse populations in the state, with 42% of its children living below the federal poverty line and rates of obesity, diabetes, smoking, and self-reported mental health issues that exceed the state average. VanDan is an expert on using health data to cover health- and health-policy-related news, and on mapping and presenting data by zip codes in ways that can "amplify the voices of the community to go along with the data." She presented her findings at the Culture of Data Conference organized by the Colorado Public Health Association in January 2021.

Awards 
In 2021, VanDan won a Maynard Institute Fellowship from the Robert C. Maynard Institute for Journalism Education, within its "Media Entrepreneur" track.

References 

Year of birth missing (living people)
Living people
American journalists
Journalists from Colorado
American journalists of Asian descent
American women journalists
American women journalists of Asian descent
Writers from Denver
People from Denver
University of Colorado Denver alumni
University of Missouri alumni
21st-century American women